Reynaldo Valdés Manzo (born 28 June 1950) is a Mexican politician affiliated with the Party of the Democratic Revolution. As of 2014, he served as Deputy of the LIX Legislature of the Mexican Congress representing Michoacán.

References

1950 births
Living people
Politicians from Michoacán
People from Zamora, Michoacán
Party of the Democratic Revolution politicians
Deputies of the LIX Legislature of Mexico
Members of the Chamber of Deputies (Mexico) for Michoacán